Ahad al Masarihah is a Governorate in Jizan Province, in south-western Saudi Arabia.

About Ahad al Msarihah 
The governorate of Ahad al Msarihah is one of the governorates of the Jizan region, "the mouth of our country the smiling", and one of the theaters is followed by many beautiful villages and hamlets scattered as if they were pearl beads in a unique necklace adorned with a good beauty of great beauty and increase in goodness, beauty and splendor when you visit these villages and that when you inhale its fresh air - and enjoy your eyes With its beautiful landscapes and orchards, which relieve the soul and relieve the worries. In one of the theater, and for more than three centuries, the Atid Market was considered the weekly meeting place for the Masarha tribes on Sunday every week.

Thousands of people from all parts and sectors of Jizan visited that market, which is known as the Sunday Market. Socially to all the tribes in the region to discuss their differences and find solutions to them, including the various social, commercial, marketing and humanitarian activities and events, which strengthened its nobility and its long-standing history, which is still a milestone in the history of Jizan Al-Talid. Today, Ahad al Msarihah governorate is one of the largest governorates of Jizan in area and one of the most populated, as well as in terms of the housing complexes it contains, totaling one hundred ten or more residential communities, inhabited by about 80 thousand tribes of the Masarha Jizan.

"Al-Munjara, Hourani, Al-Habajiya, Al-Hasama, Al-Ezz, Al-Qassum [Al-Tohari], Juha, Al-Bitarah, and Al-Shatifiya village, which is one of the most beautiful villages that follow this great and ancient governorate, Al-Hanaabah, Al-Ghusayniyah, and Al-Layl market" come at the forefront of the governorate's villages, the importance and population density. With its smoothness and ease of access from various directions through a system of paved roads linking it to the city of Jizan and the governorates of Abu Arish, Samata, Khouba and the rest of the governorates and centers of the region, what strengthens and supports the importance of the Masarhah Governorate is the presence of a vital industrial area, which has outstanding contributions in advancing development in the region and represents the southern cement factory. 

The carpentry area in the eastern Sunday is a bright sign and a prominent feature of the urban renaissance taking place in Jizan and the southern region of the Kingdom. The municipality of Ahad al Msarihah  governorate has made great efforts in establishing beautiful and wonderful places that attract visitors, hikers and lovers of fresh air, and from these places that it has prepared for visitors and hikers, it has made green spaces on the banks of the Khlab Valley in the form of a circular belt along Prince Muhammad Bin Nasser Ring Road. The form of beautiful gardens as well as sessions, including what is family, including what is special for young people, the family sessions have created two gardens planted with green grass and set up playgrounds for children, which is undoubtedly a beautiful outlet for the people. The banks of the Khilb Valley, either the youth sessions, they also worked in the form of green spaces on the banks of the valley, where a large number of young people, especially these days, spend their nights in these places exchanging greetings for Eid and memories, and eating dinner with the fresh air breeze. A number of these hikers confirmed that such the truly amazing and beautiful places always attract visitors.

Tourist Attractions 
The most important archaeological site in the governorate is the city of Al-Khasouf, and it is one of the oldest archaeological cities in the history of the Arabian Peninsula. The historian Al-Hamdani mentioned it in his book "The Characteristics of the Arabian Peninsula" in four places, where he said in the chapter Knowing the lengths and widths of the famous Arab cities.

“The width of the khasuf is a city of hakam, like the width of sadah and its length from the east is one hundred nineteen degrees.” And Al-Hamdani said in the valleys of this Sarat, then Wadi Khallab is the one that spans the fertile sides of it. This ancient city is located on the road to the cement factory in Ahad al Msariwhich that is near the magnificent tourist valley of Khlab, which is characterized by its permanent greenness, warm running water, green sur,facesbeing  and surrounded by a dense forest of trTand the archaeological city contains old houses, tombstones, archaeological ,sites and tombs inscribed with some noble Quranic verses.

Population 
The population of Ahad Al-Masarhah Governorate is 110,710, according to 2010 statistics.

See also 

 List of cities and towns in Saudi Arabia
 Regions of Saudi Arabia

References
translated by FFosais

Populated places in Jizan Province